Gokulchand Temple is a 17th-century stone built pancharatna temple in Gokulnagar village in the Joypur CD block in the Bishnupur subdivision of the Bankura district in the state of West Bengal, India.

Geography

Location

Gokulnagar is off the State Highway 2 at Salda.

Note: The map alongside presents some of the notable locations in the subdivision. All places marked in the map are linked in the larger full screen map.

The temple
David J. McCutchion mentions the Gokulchand temple at Gokulnagar as one of the earliest pancharatna temples of the Malla kings. It has turrets on four columns, a kind of chhatri, instead of the corner wall sections. Along with the at-chala, the pancharatna is the most popular type of temple in Bengal. With a 45 feet square base, it is built of laterite with stucco figures. According to the badly damaged temple plate it was built in 1639 (and that obviously goes with a question mark).

This pancharatna (five-pinnacled) temple at Gokulnagar is the largest stone temple in Bankura district. It is 64 ft. in height and the area of temple complex is 23,500 sq. ft. According to the ASI information board at the temple, it was built in 1643, during the rein of the Malla king, Raghunath Simha. The style of construction of the temple is similar to that of the Shaymaraya temple at Bishnupur. The wall decorations depict various avatars of Vishnu and raslila motifs and other mythological incidents.

The temple was in a bad shape and plundered till it was taken over by the Archaeological Survey of India in 1996. The idol of Lord Krishna has long been removed to Bishnupur. The complex is abuzz with activity when the idol is brought back for 5 days during Holi and worshipped here.

According to the List of Monuments of National Importance in West Bengal (serial no. N-WB-31) Gokulchand Temple is an ASI listed monument.

Gokulchand Temple picture gallery

References

External links

Temples in West Bengal
Monuments of National Importance in West Bengal
Tourist attractions in Bankura district